North Harbour are a New Zealand professional rugby union team based in Albany, New Zealand. Established in 1985, they play in the National Provincial Championship. They play their home games at North Harbour Stadium in Albany. The team is affiliated with the Blues Super Rugby franchise and represents the area north of Auckland. Their home playing colours are white black and maroon.

Current squad

The North Harbour squad for the 2022 Bunnings NPC is:

Honours

North Harbour have never been overall Champions. Their full list of honours, though, include:

National Provincial Championship Third Division
Winners: 1985

National Provincial Championship Second Division
Winners: 1987

Mitre 10 Cup Championship Division
Winners: 2016

Current Super Rugby players
Players named in the 2022 North Harbour squad, who also earned contracts or were named in a squad for any side participating in the 2022 Super Rugby Pacific season.

References

External links
 Official website
 Facebook page

National Provincial Championship
New Zealand rugby union teams
Sport in Auckland
Rugby union in the Auckland Region